Janet Montgomery (born 1985) is a British actress.

Janet Montgomery may also refer to:

 Janet Montgomery (archaeologist), British professor
 Janet Montgomerie, Countess of Eglinton (1854–1923), British Red Cross administrator